Deportivo Reu is a Guatemalan football team from Retalhuleu, Retalhuleu Department. It was founded on 12 June 2013 and currently plays on Primera División de Ascenso, second tier on Guatemalan football.

References 
http://fedefutguate.org

Association football clubs established in 2013
Football clubs in Guatemala